Graham Earl (born 26 August 1978) is a British former professional boxer who competed between 1997 and 2014. He held the British lightweight title twice between 2003 and 2006, the Commonwealth lightweight title from 2005 to 2006, and challenged once for the WBO interim lightweight title in 2007.

Amateur career
Earl began boxing at the age of eight. As an amateur boxer, he fought for England Schools and won his first eighteen fights.

Professional career
Earl made his professional debut on 2 September 1997, scoring a second-round stoppage over Mark O'Callaghan. He would spend the next eight years undefeated, winning 21 consecutive fights. During this time Earl won the British lightweight title twice, on 17 July 2003 and 5 June 2004, both times against Bobby Vanzie. On 25 February 2005, Earl lost for the first time to Ricky Burns, who won an eight-round points decision. In Earl's next fight, on 19 June 2005, he bounced back to retain his British lightweight title and win the Commonwealth lightweight title against Kevin Bennett.

On 17 February 2007, a bout for the newly created and vacant WBO interim lightweight title was made between Earl and Michael Katsidis. In an action-packed and fast-paced fight, Earl and Katsidis went toe-to-toe and traded many heavy blows, during which Earl was knocked down twice in the opening round and again in the second. However, soon after getting back to his feet following the third knockdown and having the towel being thrown in seconds later (only for it to be thrown back out again by referee Mickey Vann), Earl managed to floor Katsidis momentarily with a heavy right hand at close quarters, rendering the latter visibly stunned and unsteady on his feet. Earl's comeback would ultimately be short-lived, as Katsidis recovered swiftly and finished the round strongly. At the very end of round three, a low blow cost Katsidis a point, but in the following rounds he went on to deliver a barrage of largely unanswered punches to Earl until the decision was made Earl's cornermen to stop the fight after the fifth round.

Earl suffered his third loss and second in a row on 8 December 2007, when he was stopped in the first round by Amir Khan. This was repeated by Henry Castle on 17 October 2008, who stopped Earl in one round. After a five-year retirement, Earl returned to the sport on 4 July 2014. He travelled to Australia to face Michael Katsidis in a rematch from their 2007 bout, this time at light-welterweight. Katsidis won a wide twelve-round unanimous decision. Earl's final professional fight was a ten-round stoppage loss to Steve Martin on 22 August 2014.

Personal life
The youngest of three brothers, Earl grew up in the Limbury council estate of Luton and attended Icknield High School. He has two children with his ex-wife. In April 2015, Earl was sentenced to seven years in prison for illegal drug trafficking.

Professional boxing record

References

External links

1978 births
Living people
Sportspeople from Luton
English male boxers
Lightweight boxers
Commonwealth Boxing Council champions
Light-welterweight boxers
Welterweight boxers
English drug traffickers